Roman Aleksandrovich Rusinov (born 21 October 1981 in Moscow) is a Russian auto racing driver who competed in the FIA World Endurance Championship with G-Drive Racing from the Championship's first season in 2012 until 2021 and the European Le Mans Series from 2018 until 2021. He has four titles in international endurance championships.

Rusinov is the first Russian driver to win an international race in Europe.

Racing record
In 2000 Rusinov won the International Renault Finals in French Formula Renault, becoming the first Russian driver to win an international race in Europe. In 2002 he led the Formula Palmer Audi championship till the last event, but collided with his main rival and finished third overall. In 2003 he competed in Euro Formula 3000, taking a pole position at the Nürburgring.

The same year he won the LMP675 class at the first race of the Le Mans Series, the 1000 km of Le Mans. In 2004, Rusinov raced with Ferrari Modena and became the Le Mans Series Champion in the GT2 class.  In 2005, he competed in a Maserati MC12 in the FIA GT Championship and was appointed one of Russia's A1GP drivers.  The A1GP team lasted only three events before running out of funding.

In 2006, Rusinov was one of four test drivers signed to Formula One team MF1 Racing. The team's owner, Russian-born Canadian businessman Alex Shnaider, had announced an ambition to get a Russian driver into F1. Rusinov participated in the first MF1 tests at Jerez, but was the only test driver not to participate in at least one Friday practice session, due to the absence of Russian sponsors on the MF1 Racing car and the difficult financial situation of the team.

In 2008, Rusinov switched to endurance racing, driving a Reiter Engineering-prepared Lamborghini Murcielago racing under the IPB SPARTAK RACING name in the FIA GT Championship and the Le Mans Series, and a Lamborghini Gallardo in the ADAC GT Masters series. In the latter series he won two of the three races, with his driving partner Peter Kox.

In 2012 Rusinov entered the inaugural running of the FIA World Endurance Championship, joining the reigning Intercontinental Le Mans Cup champions Signatech-Nissan from round two onwards.

In 2013 Rusinov's association with G-Drive Racing began, with the Gazprom brand sponsoring the 26 car in the LMP2 category. In subsequent years until 2021 the brand and Rusinov moved through several partnerships as they expanded across WEC and in the European Le Mans Series. 

At the 2018 24 Hours of Le Mans Rusinov's G-Drive LMP2 crossed the finish line first, but was disqualified during post-race scrutineering for a modified refuelling rig in their fuel system assemblies.

In 2022 the team formally entered the 53 car to ELMS under G-Drive Racing. However, on 6 March 2022 Rusinov announced via an Instagram post that the team would not be competing, citing that he was not willing to sign off the conditions of competition for Russian athletes introduced by the FIA in response to the 2022 Russian invasion of Ukraine.

Career summary

† Guest driver ineligible to score points

‡ Teams' Standings

Complete 24 Hours of Le Mans results

Complete FIA World Endurance Championship results

Complete European Le Mans Series results

‡ Half points awarded as less than 75% of race distance was completed.

Notes

References

 Roman Rusinov page on FIAGT.com
 Roman Rusinov page on GTMasters.org 
 Roman Rusinov page on LeMans-Series.com
 Driver for Reiter Engineering
 Driver for IPB SPARTAK Racing

External links

1981 births
Living people
Russian racing drivers
French Formula Renault 2.0 drivers
Formula Renault Eurocup drivers
A1 Team Russia drivers
Auto GP drivers
Formula Palmer Audi drivers
24 Hours of Le Mans drivers
European Le Mans Series drivers
FIA World Endurance Championship drivers
ADAC GT Masters drivers
24 Hours of Daytona drivers
WeatherTech SportsCar Championship drivers
24 Hours of Spa drivers
Sportspeople from Moscow
24H Series drivers
G-Drive Racing drivers
Asian Le Mans Series drivers
Nürburgring 24 Hours drivers
OAK Racing drivers
Graff Racing drivers
Signature Team drivers
Sports car racing team owners
EuroInternational drivers
TDS Racing drivers
W Racing Team drivers
Phoenix Racing drivers
A1 Grand Prix drivers
Piquet GP drivers
Jota Sport drivers
Alan Docking Racing drivers